Smoke Lake is a lake in Cook County, Minnesota within Tofte Township. It is within the Boundary Waters Canoe Area Wilderness and the Superior National Forest.  The lake can be accessed by a  portage from Sawbill Lake to the west and a  portage from Burnt Lake to the east, which in turn is accessed from Entry Point 39 at Baker Lake through Peterson and Kelly lakes.

Recreation 
Recreational activities include camping, fishing, canoeing, and kayaking. There are four campsites on the lakeshore.

Fish species 
Fish species in Smoke Lake include northern pike, walleye, white sucker, and yellow perch.

References 

Lakes of Cook County, Minnesota
Lakes of Minnesota